The Baojun 530 is a two- or three-row compact crossover SUV produced by SAIC-GM-Wuling (SGMW) through the Baojun brand. Unveiled at the Auto Guangzhou 2017, Baojun 530 took design cues from the smaller 510 and is a successor of the 560, while the 560 remained briefly on sale as a cheaper alternative. The crossover is an example of an extensive badge engineering, as it is marketed under four different brands in several different markets.

The Baojun 530 started sale in China in February 2018. It started production in Indonesia in January 2019 as the Wuling Almaz, making Indonesia the first market outside China to receive the 530 model. In November 2018, the 530 was also introduced as the second-generation Chevrolet Captiva in Colombia. The Chevrolet-badged 530 went on sale in several South American markets since April 2019, being fully imported from China. It was launched in India as MG Hector in June 2019 as the first model released by MG Motor India.

Overview 

In the Chinese domestic market, the 530 is positioned above the 510 subcompact crossover and under the later released RS-5 within Baojun's line-up. Initial pricing of the 530 ranges from 78,800 yuan to 119,800 yuan. The 530 in China is offered with a 1.5-litre turbo petrol engine with the turbocharger sourced from Honeywell, paired with either 5-speed manual and DCT, and a 1.8-litre naturally aspirated petrol engine, paired with a 5-speed AMT.

In November 2018, the 2019 model was launched with a CVT with 8-speed simulation jointly developed with Bosch, slight adjustments to the engine power and torque, and a new speedometer layout. In January 2019, the 7-seater version of the 530 was launched.

Facelift 

The facelifted version of the 530 was released on 20 September 2019, featuring the new Baojun design language. It also received a 10.4" head unit with an integrated air conditioning control, a full LCD speedometer and a 6-seater configuration as an option.

Overseas markets

Wuling Almaz 
The 530 is marketed in Indonesia under the Wuling brand with the name Almaz, which was revealed on 23 January 2019 and launched to the market on 27 February 2019. The "Almaz" name means "diamond" in Arabic and Russian. A left-hand-drive prototype was previously displayed at the 26th Gaikindo Indonesia International Auto Show in August 2018 under the Wuling SUV name as an introduction. The car is manufactured in Indonesia with 43.5 percent of the component is sourced locally. At launch, the crossover is offered in only one variant with five seats. Initially, the Almaz was only offered with a Bosch-designed CVT.

The Almaz received a standard 10.4" head unit with an integrated air conditioning control, smartphone mirroring functionality dubbed as "Wuling Link" and other vehicle settings control embedded.

A 7-seater version was revealed on 11 July 2019 and launched at the 27th Gaikindo Indonesia International Auto Show alongside the introduction of voice command system named "WIND" (Wuling Indonesian Command), which only supports the Indonesian language. The Indonesian 7-seater version is equipped with AC blower on the third row seat with an independent air blower speed switch. The previous single variant was renamed to "Exclusive" and remains available as a 5-seater.

The entry-level variant of the 7-seater model, dubbed as "Smart Enjoy", was also launched at the same time. It is the only Almaz variant to be offered with a manual transmission.

The flagship variant of the 7-seater model, dubbed as "RS", was revealed on 18 March 2021 and launched on 29 March 2021. "WISE" (Wuling Interconnected Smart Ecosystem) is standard in this variant, which includes internet on vehicle and advanced driver-assistance systems. It is available in Exclusive and Pro trim levels. According to Wuling, "RS" stands for "Rising Star".

In September 2022, Wuling showcased the Almaz Hybrid Concept. The production version of the Almaz Hybrid was launched on 3 November 2022. It is powered by a 2.0-litre petrol hybrid engine similar to the Wuling Asta HEV.

Chevrolet Captiva 
The 530 was introduced as the second-generation Chevrolet Captiva in November 2018 at Salon de Automovil de Bogota in Colombia. It features a different front grille to match the Chevrolet logo. In April 2019, the Captiva was launched in Peru as the first launch in South America. The South American market Captiva is offered in 5-seater and 7-seater configurations, and was initially only offered with manual transmission. The Captiva is imported from China, and it slots between the Tracker/Trax and Equinox.

On 27 March 2019, GM introduced the Captiva at the Bangkok International Motor Show, Thailand. The Captiva for Thailand domestic market was imported from the SGMW facility in Cikarang, Indonesia. On September 25, 2019, SGMW Indonesia exported their first batch of cars, 20 months after its operation in Indonesia. Unlike the Captiva for the South American market, the Thai-spec Captiva is equipped with a 10.4" head unit, electronic parking brake, panoramic sunroof and a 360-degree around-view camera like the Wuling Almaz and would only be offered in CVT.

Starting in October 2019, Chevrolet Captiva was officially launched in Thailand in three trims: LS, LT and Premier. In February 2020, GM announced that it will exit from the Thailand market. As the result, the Captiva are no longer imported to the country. About 2,000 Captivas were sold out by 19 February 2020.

In May 2020, Captiva went on sale in the Middle East. It is the cheapest Chevrolet crossover available in the market, slotting below the Equinox.

Currently, the Captiva is available in Bolivia, Brunei, Colombia, Chile, Ecuador, Fiji, Peru, Uruguay, and select Middle East countries. Its launch for the Mexican market was announced on 10 November 2020 for the first quarter of 2021, using the updated styling from the 2020 Baojun 530. It went on sale on spring 2021 and it is positioned below the Equinox.

In Brunei, the Captiva was replaced by the identical Wuling Almaz in December 2020.

MG Hector 

In India, the 530 was marketed as the MG Hector as the first model in India released by MG Motor India. It is built in Halol, Gujarat in a former General Motors plant with a local content of 75 percent. MG Hector sports a honeycomb grille, dual-projector LED headlight, rear LED lights, chrome finish elements in some exterior parts instead of a matte silver finish, and a tail lamp extension garnish.

The Hector is equipped with a 10.4" head unit with more features than Almaz including e-SIM support, navigation system, extensive smartphone integration telematics such as remote engine start, remote AC controls, vehicle locator and tracker. It also comes with Apple CarPlay and Android Auto support, Gaana music streaming service support, and over-the-air (OTA) software update all dubbed as the iSMART technology. All MG Hector (except the Style variant) gained an 'Internet Inside' branding emblem in the exterior.

The Hector is available in four trim levels: Style, Super, Smart and Sharp, and available in three different engine options: 1.5-litre petrol turbo, 1.5-litre petrol turbo with mild hybrid technology, and a 2.0-litre turbo-diesel sourced from Fiat Chrysler. Only the former engine received an automatic transmission option, specifically dual-clutch transmission.

The promotional videos for MG Hector was filmed in London, United Kingdom, featuring British actor Benedict Cumberbatch as the MG Motor brand ambassador. 

An updated version was released in January 2021 for the 2021 model year. It features a reworked front grille, new 18-inch alloy wheels, and a beige interior colour scheme. The petrol version of the 2021 Hector is also offered with a CVT gearbox option alongside the 6-speed DCT.

An another updated version was launched in January 2023 as a 2023 model year. It Features a redesigned large grille, 14 inch touchscreen and ADAS Level 2.

MG Hector Plus 
In Auto Expo 2020, MG Motor India introduced the MG Hector Plus as the three-row variant of the Hector. The Hector Plus features a new fascia look with new bumpers, headlights and taillights. It was released in July 2020, with two seat configuration options: 6-seater (captain seat) and 7-seater (bench seat).

It was updated in January 2021 alongside the regular Hector, featuring larger 18-inch alloy wheels.

It was updated in January 2023 alongside with regular Hector, featuring redesigned large grille, 14 inch touchscreen and ADAS Level 2.

Powertrain

Sales 
In 2022, the Captiva-badged 530 became the best-selling SUV in Mexico.

References

External links 

 

530
Front-wheel-drive vehicles
Cars introduced in 2017
Cars of China
Crossover sport utility vehicles
Compact sport utility vehicles
Vehicles with CVT transmission